Nora's Hair Salon is a 2004 independent comedy-drama film, written by Chanel Capra and Jean-Claude La Marre, and directed by Jerry LaMothe. This film stars Jenifer Lewis, Tamala Jones, and Tatyana Ali.

Plot
Nora Harper (Jenifer Lewis) is an African-American businesswoman who owns a hair salon in Los Angeles, California. She keeps a watchful eye over her employees, friends, relatives, and regular customers. Lilleana (Tatyana Ali) is a new employee from the Dominican Republic who is in an abusive relationship with Bennie (Bobby Brown). Chloe (Tamala Jones) is a hairstylist with aspirations of a career in show business. Ming (Lucille Soong) is an opinionated manicurist with anger issues. Devin (Jean-Claude LaMarre) is a bisexual man who is uncertain about his relationship with Delicious (Donn Swaby), and fears losing his girlfriend (played by Lil' Kim as herself) in the event she discovers his attraction to men. Later in the film, Nora suffers a heart attack; her friends from the salon hope for her recovery, but she dies shortly before the end of the film. In the end, the salon remains open, selling Nora's hairstyling products.

Cast
Jenifer Lewis as Nora Harper
Tamala Jones as Chloe (addressed as "Clo")
Tatyana Ali as Lilleana
Jean-Claude La Marre as Devin
Bobby Brown as Benny
Lucille Soong as Ming
Christine Carlo as Xenobia
Donn Swaby as Delicious
Jonathan McDaniel as Leronne
Lil' Kim as Herself
Whitney Houston as Herself
Cheyenne Maxey as Girl Scout

Sequel
A direct-to-video sequel was released, titled Nora's Hair Salon 2: A Cut Above featuring Tatyana Ali in the starring role, and co-starring Stacy Dash, Donn Swaby, Bobby Brown, and Mekhi Phifer. The film is lighter in tone and content than its predecessor, with a PG-13 rating. Creator and co-star Jean-Claude La Marre cameos as Devin, who has become a minister and is now straight, much to the chagrin of his ex Delicious.

A third film was released in 2011 titled Nora's Hair Salon 3: The Cutting Edge. However, none of the original cast appears. This time around, Delicious is the main character and new owner of the salon.

External links

2004 films
2004 comedy-drama films
African-American comedy-drama films
American independent films
Films set in Los Angeles
2004 comedy films
2004 drama films
2004 independent films
2000s English-language films
2000s American films